Cook Islands Netball Association is the national body which oversees, promotes and manages netball in Cook Islands.  The Cook Islands Netball Association is a member of Oceania Netball Federation.

Clubs
In 1990, the Cook Islands Netball Association included about 15 clubs, all based in the southern islands group. They are Ngatangia/Matavera, Avatiu/Nikao, Arorangi, Titikaveka, Takuvaine, Tupapa, Outer Islands.

See also
 Netball in the Cook Islands
 Cook Islands national netball team

References

Bibliography

External links
 Cook Islands Netball Association website

Netball in the Cook Islands
Netball governing bodies in Oceania
Netball 
Coo